Yevgeniya Grigoryevna Zinurova (born 16 November 1982) is a Russian runner who specializes in the 800 metres. She was born in Zlatoust in Russia's Chelyabinsk Oblast. She has personal bests of 1:58.04 minutes for the 800 m and 4:10.26 minutes for the 1500 metres.

She won the Russian title over 800 m in 2008 and made her international debut two years later at the 2010 IAAF World Indoor Championships, where she finished sixth in the final. On her following appearance for Russia she won the gold medal at the 2011 European Athletics Indoor Championships.

Achievements

References

External links 

1982 births
Living people
Russian female middle-distance runners
People from Zlatoust
Doping cases in athletics
Russian sportspeople in doping cases
Sportspeople from Chelyabinsk Oblast